The A28 motorway is a motorway in the Netherlands. It is approximately 188 kilometers in length.

The A28 traverses the Dutch provinces of Utrecht, Gelderland, Overijssel, Drenthe and Groningen. The road connects the cities of Utrecht, Amersfoort, Zwolle, Assen, and Groningen.

Overview

The A28 motorway's southern terminus is in the city of Utrecht, at an intersection with the Waterlinieweg, an important arterial road through the eastern part of the city. Major motorway junctions can be found at the interchanges Rijnsweerd near Utrecht (A27), Hoevelaken near Amersfoort (A1), Hattemerbroek near Zwolle (motorway A50 / highway N50), Lankhorst near Meppel (A32) and Hoogeveen near Hoogeveen (A37). The northern terminus is at the traffic light controlled intersection of Julianaplein near Groningen (motorway A7 / highway N7).

The A28, however, is not the most direct connection between Utrecht and Groningen.  The route via Lelystad and Heerenveen, following the A27, A6 and the A7, is some 10 kilometers shorter. Groningen is not signed at the southern terminus of the motorway to avoid confusion. Groningen first appears on the signs near exit Soesterberg. 

The A28 motorway generally has 2x2 lanes, except for a short section just east of Utrecht where shoulder running is allowed during rushhour, and the section between the junctions Hattemerbroek (A50/N50) and Lankhorst (A32). In the city of Zwolle, narrow additional lanes are added in the median that can be opened depending on traffic flow, whereas three permanent lanes are available between exit 21 and junction Lankhorst.

European route 

Between the interchange Hoevelaken near Amersfoort and the terminus at Julianaplein in Groningen, the A28 is also a European route: the E232.  This section of the A28 is the complete E232 route; the E232 does not consist of any other road or section.

Exit list

External links

Constituent roads of European route E30
Motorways in the Netherlands
Motorways in Drenthe
Motorways in Gelderland
Motorways in Groningen (province)
Motorways in Overijssel
Motorways in Utrecht (province)
Transport in Groningen (city)
Transport in Utrecht (city)